The Alfred I. DuPont Building is a historic building in Miami, Florida. It is located at 169 East Flagler Street. Started in 1937 and completed in 1939, it is a 17-story rectangular building in the Modern style with Art Deco embellishments. It was the first skyscraper built after the County courthouse and the bust of 1928. Thus it represents Miami's emergence from the great depression. It replaced the Halcyon Hotel on this site.  On January 4, 1989, it was added to the U.S. National Register of Historic Places.

Alfred I. DuPont was the owner of the Florida National Bank, the principal tenant of the building.

References

External links

 Florida's Office of Cultural and Historical Programs
 

Office buildings completed in 1939
National Register of Historic Places in Miami
Skyscraper office buildings in Miami
Art Deco architecture in Florida
Office buildings on the National Register of Historic Places
1939 establishments in Florida